Andy Lee is a German musician who plays American piano rock 'n' roll music solo or with his backing band Tennessee Rain. In 2012, with other Hannover-based musicians, Lee took part in the release of HerzStücke a fund-raising CD for Hannover's children's hospital.

Discography
 Put Your Cat Clothes On! (Rockhouse, 1992) 
 Good Rockin' Teddy (Grunwald Records, 1994) 
 Wild 'n' Rough - Live with Tennessee Rain (Grunwald Records, 1999)

References

External links
Official website

German male musicians
Living people
Year of birth missing (living people)
Place of birth missing (living people)